The men's decathlon event at the 1986 World Junior Championships in Athletics was held in Athens, Greece, at Olympic Stadium on 16 and 17 July.  Senior implements (106.7 cm (3'6) hurdles, 7257g shot, 2 kg discus) were used.

Medalists

Results

Final
16/17 July

N.B. In the 100 meters, of the 4 heats, two were run with legal wind & two heats were run with wind above the legal limit of 2 m/s.

Participation
According to an unofficial count, 29 athletes from 21 countries participated in the event.

References

Decathlon
Combined events at the World Athletics U20 Championships